Whatsit may refer to:
 Whatsit, a placeholder name 
 Waterman Whatsit, an aeroplane designed by Waldo Waterman
 Mrs. Whatsit, a character in A Wrinkle in Time by Madeleine L'Engle
 Wotsits, cheese puffs produced by Walkers, a British snack food manufacturer
 The WHATSIT database program
 Martin M-1 Whatsit, glider